The Rochelle Historic District is a  historic district in Rochelle, Georgia that was listed on the National Register of Historic Places in 2008.  It is centered on 1st Avenue and Ashley Street.  The district included 180 buildings deemed to be contributing resources, two other contributing structures, and two contributing sites.  It also included 90 non-contributing buildings and structures.

One building included is the First Baptist Church of Rochelle (1918), at the corner of Gordon Street and 3rd Avenue, designed by architect James J. Baldwin.

References

Historic districts on the National Register of Historic Places in Georgia (U.S. state)
Victorian architecture in Georgia (U.S. state)
Buildings and structures completed in 1887
National Register of Historic Places in Wilcox County, Georgia